The Unemployment Insurance Act 1921 was an Act of Parliament in the United Kingdom. The Act stated that under-18s were to receive less unemployment benefits than adults along with women who were to receive less than men.

References

Insurance legislation
United Kingdom Acts of Parliament 1921
1921 in economics
Unemployment in the United Kingdom
Unemployment benefits